The 1997 MTV Video Music Awards aired live on September 4, 1997, honoring the best music videos from June 17, 1996, to June 16, 1997. The show was hosted by Chris Rock at Radio City Music Hall in New York City.

American singer Beck took home the most Moonmen of the night, winning a total of five awards.  British acid jazz band Jamiroquai closely followed, though, taking home four awards including the coveted Video of the Year prize.  The only other multiple winner that night was British dance outfit The Prodigy, which took home both the American and European Viewer's Choice awards – making them the first act in VMA history to win two Viewer's Choice awards in the same year.

As for nominations, Jamiroquai dominated the field with a total of ten nominations for their video for "Virtual Insanity."  In second place was Beck, who received a total of seven mentions: five for "The New Pollution" and two for "Devils Haircut."  Lastly, Nine Inch Nails came in third with five nominations for "The Perfect Drug."  Unlike Beck and Jamiroquai, though, Nine Inch Nails went home empty-handed that night.

Background
MTV announced on July 7 that the 1997 Video Music Awards would be held at Radio City Music Hall on September 4 and hosted by Chris Rock. Nominees were announced on July 22. MTV noted prior to the show that performances would be "more heavily choreographed" than in previous ceremonies. The ceremony broadcast was preceded by the 1997 MTV Video Music Awards Opening Act. Hosted by Kurt Loder and Tabitha Soren with reports from Serena Altschul, Chris Connelly, Abbie Kearse, and John Norris, the broadcast featured red carpet interviews, a pre-taped interview with Mariah Carey, the world premiere of Janet Jackson's music video for "Got 'til It's Gone", and performances from Foo Fighters and The Mighty Mighty Bosstones. The Foo Fighters performance was notable for guitarist Pat Smear's announcement that he was leaving the band and Franz Stahl's debut as a band member.

Performances

Presenters

Pre-show
 Chris Connelly and Serena Altschul – presented Best Rock Video and announced the winners of the professional categories and Breakthrough Video

Main show
 Cindy Crawford and Pat Smear – presented Best Group Video
 Martha Stewart and Busta Rhymes – presented Best Dance Video
 Dennis Franz – appeared in vignettes about Viewer's Choice nominees
 Madonna – talked about the death of Diana, Princess of Wales, and introduced The Prodigy
 Kevin Bacon and Janeane Garofalo – presented Best Video from a Film
 Adam Sandler and Meredith Brooks – presented Best Alternative Video
 Wu-Tang Clan – introduced Lil' Kim, Missy Elliott, Angie Martinez, Da Brat and Lisa Lopes
 Elton John – announced that MTV would donate a portion of the ceremony's proceeds to the Diana, Princess of Wales Memorial Fund, and presented Best New Artist in a Video
 Dermot Mulroney and John Popper – presented Best Male Video (and also announced Beck's win for Best Direction in a Video)
 Mariah Carey – presented the Video Vanguard Award to LL Cool J
 No Doubt – presented Best R&B Video
 Mike Myers – introduced Beck
 Sheryl Crow – chatted with The Rolling Stones via satellite, then introduced the next presenters
 Fiona Apple and Chris Tucker – introduced the International Viewer's Choice Awards winners
 Maxwell, Dave Matthews and Boyd Tinsley – presented Best Rap Video
 Janet Jackson – presented the Video Vanguard Award to Mark Romanek
 Naomi Campbell – introduced Jamiroquai
 David Arquette and Lisa Marie Presley – presented Viewer's Choice
 Blackstreet – presented Best Female Video
 Will Smith – presented Video of the Year
 Daria and Jodie – appeared before the final commercial break to sarcastically praise the show

Winners and nominees
Winners are in bold text.

See also
1997 MTV Europe Music Awards

External links
 Official MTV site

References

1997
MTV Video Music Awards
MTV Video Music Awards
1997 in American music